Sara Thygesen (born 20 January 1991) is a Danish badminton player, specializing in doubles. She started playing badminton at Gårslev in 2002. She got an award for the best female athlete of the year 2007 in her hometown Fredericia. In 2014, she joined the Denmark national badminton team, then in 2015, she won a gold medal at the European Games with her partner in the mixed doubles Niclas Nøhr.

Career 
Thygesen competed at the 2020 Tokyo Olympics partnering Maiken Fruergaard. Her pace at the Games was stopped in the group stage after placing 4th in the group C standings.

Achievements

European Games 
Mixed doubles

European Championships 
Women's doubles

Mixed doubles

European Junior Championships 
Mixed doubles

BWF World Tour (2 titles, 2 runners-up) 
The BWF World Tour, which was announced on 19 March 2017 and implemented in 2018, is a series of elite badminton tournaments sanctioned by the Badminton World Federation (BWF). The BWF World Tour is divided into levels of World Tour Finals, Super 1000, Super 750, Super 500, Super 300 (part of the HSBC World Tour), and the BWF Tour Super 100.

Women's doubles

Mixed doubles

BWF Grand Prix (1 title, 1 runner-up) 
The BWF Grand Prix had two levels, the Grand Prix and Grand Prix Gold. It was a series of badminton tournaments sanctioned by the Badminton World Federation (BWF) and played between 2007 and 2017.

Mixed doubles

  BWF Grand Prix Gold tournament
  BWF Grand Prix tournament

BWF International Challenge/Series (7 titles, 6 runners-up) 
Women's doubles

Mixed doubles

  BWF International Challenge tournament
  BWF International Series tournament

References

External links 
 

1991 births
Living people
People from Fredericia
Danish female badminton players
Badminton players at the 2020 Summer Olympics
Olympic badminton players of Denmark
Badminton players at the 2015 European Games
Badminton players at the 2019 European Games
European Games gold medalists for Denmark
European Games medalists in badminton
Sportspeople from the Region of Southern Denmark